Baca Kurti Gjokaj ( 1807–1881) was an Albanian leader who participated in the Battle of Ržanicë against the Principality of Montenegro.

Life
Baca was born around 1807 in the village of Milješ (Milesh) in the Gruda tribal region near the town of Tuzi, to an Albanian highlander (Malësor) family. In 1856, he became voivode of Gruda after putting down a band of rebels in Fundna. He also killed the brother of Marko Miljanov that year.

He was one of 15 Ottoman delegates from northern Albania sent during the talks of the Congress of Berlin (13 June–13 July 1878). Apart from three guards from Mirditë, of the Catholic delegates included chiefs Çun Mula from Hoti, Baca Kurti from Gruda, Marash Dashi from Shkreli, Cil Vuksani from Kastrati, Mark Lula from Shala, Mark Kola from Shosha and Con Geda from Shllaku.

He joined the Albanian nationalist League of Prizren after the decision of the Congress of Berlin to hand over the Albanian-inhabited regions of Hoti, Gruda, Plav, Gusinje, Kastrati, etc. to the Principality of Montenegro. When Prince Nicholas I of Montenegro entered the territory which had been ceded to him by the Congress of Berlin, Baca Kurti and other chiefs of Malësia organized a resistance against Montenegro. The northern Albanian highlanders defeated the Montenegrins in the Battle of Ržanica. He was distinguished as one of the best commanders of Çun Mula during the battle.

He mobilized not only the members of his clan, but also the members of other towns of Malësia, to fight against the Montenegrin army and to have the Montenegrins leave Albanian territory: all males from 7 to 70 years old, united, forced the Montenegrin forces to retire. Today he is known to Albanians worldwide as many songs and poems were created in his honor.

Annotations

References

Further reading

1807 births
1881 deaths
19th-century Albanian people
Albanians from the Ottoman Empire
Activists of the Albanian National Awakening
Albanian Roman Catholics
Military personnel from Podgorica
Malsorë
People from Scutari vilayet
Albanians in Montenegro